Burkinabé passports are issued to Burkinabe citizens to travel outside Burkina Faso.

Physical properties
 Surname
 Given names
 Nationality Burkinabe/Burkinabé
 Date of birth 
 Sex  
 Place of birth  
 Date of Expiry 
 Passport number

Languages

The data page/information page is printed in French and English.

See also 
 ECOWAS passports
 List of passports
 Visa requirements for Burkinabe citizens

References

Passports by country
Government of Burkina Faso